Scottish Journal of Political Economy is a scholarly political economy journal published by the Scottish Economic Society.

Sir Alexander Cairncross was the first editor in 1954.  Since 2021 the editor is David A. Jaeger.

According to the Journal Citation Reports, the journal has a 2014 impact factor of 0.286, ranking it 131st out of 161 journals in the category "Political Science" and 29th out of 333 journals in the category "Economics".

The journal is published by Wiley Publishing under .  Since January 2022 the journal is published exclusively online.

References 

1954 establishments in Scotland
Economics journals
Economy of Scotland
Quarterly journals
Publications established in 1954